, previously and still famously known as Sunrise Inc., is a Japanese animation studio founded in September 1972 and is based in Ogikubo, Tokyo. Its former names were also Soeisha, Sunrise Studio and Nippon Sunrise.

Its primary division, is renowned for critically praised and popular original anime series such as Gundam, Cowboy Bebop, Space Runaway Ideon, Armored Trooper Votoms, Magic God Hero Legend Wataru, Yoroiden Samurai Troopers, Future GPX Cyber Formula, Crush Gear Turbo, The Vision of Escaflowne, Love Live!, Witch Hunter Robin, My-HiME, My-Otome, Code Geass: Lelouch of the Rebellion, Tiger & Bunny, and Cross Ange: Rondo of Angel and Dragon, as well as its numerous adaptations of acclaimed light novels including Crest of the Stars, Dirty Pair, Horizon in the Middle of Nowhere and Accel World, and manga such as City Hunter, Inuyasha, Outlaw Star, Yakitate!! Japan, Planetes, Sgt. Frog, Gin Tama, and Kekkaishi. Their productions usually feature fluid animation and action sequences and many fans refer to the quality of their work as "Sunrise Smooth".

Most of their work are original titles created in-house by their creative staff under a collective pseudonym, Hajime Yatate. They also operated a defunct video-game studio, Sunrise Interactive. Sunrise launched a light-novel publisher, Yatate Bunko Imprint, on September 30, 2016, to publish original titles and supplement their existing franchises with new materials. Anime created by Sunrise which have won the Animage Anime Grand Prix are Mobile Suit Gundam in 1979 and the first half of 1980, Space Runaway Ideon in the second half of 1980, Crusher Joe (a co-production with Studio Nue) in 1983, Dirty Pair in 1985, Future GPX Cyber Formula in 1991, Gundam SEED in 2002, Gundam SEED Destiny in 2004 and 2005, Code Geass: Lelouch of the Rebellion in 2006 and 2007 and Code Geass R2 in 2008, making Sunrise the studio which won the largest number of Animage Awards.

History

Rather than having anime production revolve around a single creator (like Mushi, headed by Osamu Tezuka), Sunrise decided that production should focus on the producers. The market for mainstream anime (such as manga adaptations, sports shows, and adaptations of popular children's stories) was already dominated by existing companies, so Sunrise decided to focus on robot anime, known to be more difficult to animate but which could be used to sell toys.

Sunrise has been involved in many popular and acclaimed anime television series, including Mobile Suit Gundam (and its spin-offs and sequels since 1979), the Magic God Hero Legend Wataru series (1988–1997), the Brave (1990–1997) and Eldran series (1991–1993), both of which were co-produced with Takara Tomy, and the Crest of the Stars series (1999–2001). They produced the apocalyptic Space Runaway Ideon in 1980.

The company have co-produced a number of series with Toei Company, including Majokko Tickle (from episode 16), the Robot Romance Trilogy (Chōdenji Robo Combattler V (1976), Chōdenji Machine Voltes V (1977), Tōshō Daimos (1978)), Daltanious, and Cyborg 009 (a 1979 co-production with Toei Animation). Sunrise is well known for their mecha anime series (including Gundam), such as Invincible Steel Man Daitarn 3 (1978), Fang of the Sun Dougram (1981), the Armored Trooper Votoms and Aura Battler Dunbine series (1983), Blue Comet SPT Layzner (1985), Patlabor (1989), The Vision of Escaflowne (1996), The Big O (1999/2003), Overman King Gainer (2002), Zegapain (2007), Code Geass (2006/2008), Tiger & Bunny (2011), and Valvrave the Liberator (2013), and worked with Tsuburaya Productions to animate The Ultraman (1979).

On April 1, 2022, Bandai Namco Holdings adopted a new logo that had been initially revealed in October 2021, and with it, a major organization shuffle occurred, resulting in Sunrise subsuming the visual arts division of Bandai Namco Arts, which was dissolved that same day. Following this, the company has adopted the same logo as its parent, and adopted the name of Bandai Namco Filmworks. Its music division, Sunrise Music, has similarly subsumed Bandai Namco Arts' music operations, including Lantis, and changed its name to Bandai Namco Music Live. The Sunrise name has been kept as one of the major brands of the company.

Studios
Studio 1 was created when Sunrise was founded in 1972. Notable works include Mobile Suit Gundam, Space Runaway Ideon, Armored Trooper Votoms, Patlabor, and Inuyasha. It was also the studio responsible for various later Gundam installments: G, Wing, X, Turn A, Unicorn, Reconguista in G, Thunderbolt, Narrative, and Hathaway.
Studio 2 was created around 1974–75, and some key members left to form Bones in 1998. Notable works include Aura Battler Dunbine  and some installments of Gundam: including Zeta, ZZ, Victory, Char's Counterattack and F91. It also worked on The Vision of Escaflowne and Cowboy Bebop, co-producing a film adaptation of each with Bones.
Studio 3 was created in 1975. Early works included Blue Comet SPT Layzner and City Hunter. It was responsible for many Gundam installments, including 0083, 08th MS Team, and TV series of the franchise: 00, AGE, Build Fighters, Build Fighters Try, Iron-Blooded Orphans and The Witch from Mercury.
Studio 4 was created in 1979, and notable works include The Ultraman anime. The studio became inactive in 1987. The current Studio 4 began as support for Studio 2, and was known as Studio Iogi (井荻スタジオ) (named after the pseudonym of longtime Sunrise director Yoshiyuki Tomino). The studio's first major work was 1985's Dirty Pair, and other notable works include Planetes, s-CRY-ed and Code Geass.
Studio 5 was also created in 1979. One of its producers was Mikihiro Iwata, a founder of A-1 Pictures. Notable works include Crest of the Stars, the InuYasha movies, Daily Lives of High School Boys, Aikatsu!, Good Luck Girl!, Gin Tama, Mobile Suit SD Gundam and Mobile Suit Gundam 0080: War in the Pocket.
Studio 6 was created in 1983. Notable works include The Big O, Sgt. Frog, and Tiger & Bunny. they also provided animation to Batman: The Animated Series. Some members left to form Bridge in 2007.
Studio 7 was created in 1985. Its first work, uncredited, was on the American cartoon series Centurions: Power Xtreme, and it is noted for Sacred Seven, s-CRY-ed and the Yūsha series. Some members left to form Manglobe in 2002.
Established around 1995, Studio 8 is notable for My-HiME, Buddy Complex, Idolmaster: Xenoglossia, The Girl Who Leapt Through Space, Horizon in the Middle of Nowhere, Accel World and Love Live!.
Studio 7's sister studio, Studio 9 was established in 1996. Notable works include Gasaraki, Infinite Ryvius, Mobile Suit Gundam SEED and SEED Destiny, Argento Soma and Battle Spirits.
Studio 5's sister studio, Studio 10 was established around 1996. Notable works include Outlaw Star, Dinosaur King and Phi Brain: Puzzle of God.
Studio 8's sister studio, Studio 11 was established in 2009 and worked on Kurokami and the SD Gundam Sangokuden Brave Battle Warriors series.
Sunrise's CG production studio, D.I.D. helps creating CG for many of the company's shows (notably Tiger & Bunny, Zegapain, Cross Ange, Valvrave the Liberator, Gundam MS Igloo and Gundam The Origin). They also produce CG work for other animation studios, including Xebec's Space Battleship Yamato 2199.
Formerly known as Ogikubo Studio (荻窪スタジオ) or Sunrise Emotion, Nerima Studio is best known for the Freedom Project, Valvrave the Liberator, the King of Thorn anime film and Cross Ange.
Sunrise Origin Studio (サンライズオリジンスタジオ) is Sunrise's in-between animation studio that does in-between animation for other studios' anime titles such as My Hero Academia to The Boy and the Beast.
Sunrise Beyond Inc. is a subsidiary of Sunrise established after the purchase and closure of Xebec. Some of their works include Gundam Build Divers Re:Rise and King's Raid: Successors of the Will.
White Base  is a new studio to open in November 2021 and is named after the famous battle ship from Gundam.

TV animation

1970s

1980s

1990s

2000s

2010s
{| class="wikitable sortable"
|-
!No.
!Title !! Year(s) !! Broadcast network(s) !! Studios !! Notes
|-
|133
|SD Gundam Sangokuden Brave Battle Warriors
|April 2010–March 2011
|TV Tokyo
|Nerima Studio
|
|-
|134
|Battle Spirits Brave
|September 2010–September 2011
|TV Asahi
|Studio 9
|
|-
|135
|Tiger & Bunny
|April 2011–September 2011
|BS11
|Studio 6
|
|-
|136
|Gintama'
|April 2011–March 2012
|TV Tokyo
|Studio 5
|
|-
|137
|Sacred Seven|July 2011–September 2011
|MBS
|Studio 7
|
|-
|138
|Battle Spirits: Heroes|September 2011–September 2012
|TV Asahi
|Studio 9
|
|-
|139
|Horizon in the Middle of Nowhere|October 2011–December 2011
|MBS
|Studio 8
|
|-
|140
|Mobile Suit Gundam AGE|October 2011–September 2012
|TBS
|Studio 3
|In association with Level-5
|-
|141
|Phi Brain: Puzzle of God|October 2011–March 2014
|NHK
|Studio 10
|
|-
|142
|Daily Lives of High School Boys|January 2012–March 2012
|TV Tokyo
|Studio 9
|
|-
|143
|Natsuiro Kiseki|April 2012–June 2012
|MBS
|Studio 11
|
|-
|144
|Accel World|April 2012–September 2012
|Tokyo MX
|Studio 8
|In association with GENCO

|-
|145
|Good Luck Girl!|July 2012–September 2012
|TV Tokyo
|Studio 9
|
|-
|146
|Horizon in the Middle of Nowhere 2nd Season|July 2012–September 2012
|MBS
|Studio 8
|
|-
|147
|Battle Spirits: Sword Eyes|September 2012–September 2013
|TV Asahi
|Studio 9
|
|-
|148
|Gintama' Overtime|October 2012–March 2013
|TV Tokyo
|Studio 5
|
|-
|149
|Aikatsu!|October 2012–March 2016
|TV Tokyo
|Studio 9 & Studio 5
|Later animation provided by Bandai Namco Pictures
|-
|150
|Love Live! School Idol Project|January 2013–March 2013
|Tokyo MX
|Studio 8
|
|-
|151
|Valvrave the Liberator|April 2013–December 2013
|MBS/TBS
|Nerima Studio
|
|-
|152
|Battle Spirits: Saikyou Ginga Ultimate Zero|September 2013–September 2014
|TV Asahi
|Studio 9
|
|-
|153
|Gundam Build Fighters|October 2013–March 2014
|TV Tokyo
|Studio 3
|
|-
|154
|Buddy Complex|January 2014–March 2014
|Tokyo MX
|Studio 8
|
|-
|155
|KERORO|March 2014–September 2014
|Animax
|Studio 6
|
|-
|156
|Love Live! 2nd Season|April 2014–June 2014
|Tokyo MX
|Studio 8
|
|-
|157
|Mobile Suit Gundam-san|July 2014–September 2014
|Tokyo MX
|Studio 6
|
|-
|158
|Tribe Cool Crew|September 2014–October 2015
|TV Asahi
|
|In association with Ajia-do Animation Works
|-
|159
|Gundam Reconguista in G|October 2014–March 2015
|MBS/TBS
|Studio 1
|
|-
|160
|Gundam Build Fighters Try|October 2014–April 2015
|TV Tokyo
|Studio 3
|
|-
|161
|Cross Ange: Rondo of Angels and Dragons|October 2014–March 2015
|Tokyo MX
|Nerima Studio
|
|-
|162
|Mobile Suit Gundam: Iron-Blooded Orphans|October 2015–March 2016
|MBS
|Studio 3
|
|-
|163
|Mobile Suit Gundam Unicorn RE:0096|April 2016–September 2016
|TV Asahi
|
|
|-
|164
| Love Live! Sunshine!!|July 2016–September 2016
|Tokyo MX
|Studio 8
|
|-
|165
|Mobile Suit Gundam: Iron-Blooded Orphans: 2nd Season|October 2016–March 2017
|TBS/MBS
|Studio 3
|
|-
|166
|Magic-kyun Renaissance|October 2016-January 2017
|Tokyo MX
|Studio 8
|
|-
|167
|Classicaloid|October 2016–April 2017
|NHK
|Studio 5
|
|-
|168
|Love Live! Sunshine!! 2nd Season|October 2017–December 2017
|Tokyo MX
|Studio 8
|
|-
|169
|Gundam Build Divers|April 2018–September 2018
|TV Tokyo
|
|
|-
|170
|Double Decker! Doug & Kirill|October 2018–December 2018
|Tokyo MX
|
|
|-
|171
|Mobile Suit Gundam: The Origin - Advent of the Red Comet|April 2019–August 2019
|NHK General TV
|
|
|}

2020s

Films

OVAs/ONAs

Non-Japanese productions

Video game animation work

Miscellaneous work
 Nagoya TV (1981-1987, The ""Space Boy"" mascot opening/closing credits)
 Pink Crows (did the animation and designs for this animated band and their music videos)
 Pop Team Epic (2020-2022, Series 1 Special Episode 1 1st half prologue skit and opening animation; Series 2 Episode 2 story part and ending animation)
 Cowboy Bebop (2021, live action TV series co-produced with Netflix, Midnight Radio and Tomorrow Studios)

International distribution
Most anime produced by Sunrise and Bandai and licensed by Bandai Visual in Japan was licensed and distributed in the United States by Bandai Entertainment and in Europe by Beez Entertainment, but both companies shut down in 2012 after Bandai Entertainment's restructuring. In North America, distributors such as Funimation, Viz Media, Sentai Filmworks, NIS America and Aniplex of America, as well as Sunrise USA, have licensed Sunrise properties. In Europe, Anime Limited and Manga Entertainment (in the UK) and Kazé (in France) have begun to distribute titles distributed by Beez and other unreleased Sunrise productions. In Australia, Sunrise productions are licensed and distributed by Madman Entertainment. At Anime Boston 2013, Sunrise confirmed that they would begin licensing anime in North America and were negotiating with Sentai, Funimation, and Viz to distribute their titles on DVD and Blu-ray. Right Stuf agreed to distribute and re-release Mobile Suit Gundam Unicorn on DVD in North America. In 2014 the deal expanded, releasing the Gundam previously licensed by Bandai Entertainment (Mobile Suit Gundam, Turn A Gundam) and several works not released in North America (including Mobile Suit Gundam ZZ'') in 2015.

References

External links

 
Official Website for Sunrise 
 
Sunrise International 

 
Animation studios in Tokyo
Animax
Bandai Namco Holdings subsidiaries
Mass media companies established in 1972
Japanese animation studios
Japanese companies established in 1972
Suginami